The Waccamaw silverside (Menidia extensa) is a rare species of fish in the family Atherinopsidae. It is a federally listed threatened species of the United States.

Description
This is a small (growing to about 2.5 inches), slim, almost transparent fish with a silvery stripe along each side. Its body is laterally compressed, the eyes are large, and the jaw is sharply angled upward. This fish spawns from April through June, but spawning reaches its peak when water temperatures are between 68 and 72 Fahrenheit. Fully developed larvae form small isolated schools by early May. No parental care of the young has been noted. The silversides reach sexual maturity by the following spring, spawn, and then shortly thereafter most of the adults die off. A few may survive a second winter.

Range and population level 
Known only from Lake Waccamaw and the upper Waccamaw River in Columbus County, North Carolina, the silverside is found in the upper Waccamaw River only during periods of high water and is not a permanent resident. Lake Waccamaw (not to be confused with the town of Lake Waccamaw) is the property of the State of North Carolina and is administered by the North Carolina Department of Natural Resources and Community Development's Division of Parks and Recreation. The species' population is estimated to be in the millions.

Habitat 
Although it is fed by acidic swamp streams, the lake has a virtually neutral composition. This neutral condition, unusual among North Carolina's coastal plain lakes, is believed to be caused by the buffering effect of the calcareous Waccamaw Limestone formation, which underlies the lake and is exposed on the north shore. The Waccamaw silverside inhabits open water throughout the lake, where schools are commonly found near the surface over shallow, dark-bottomed areas.

Biology
This species is normally found in large schools close to the surface in open waterhwhere the substrate is dark and sandy. The population is able to tolerate heavy predation and they are frequently observed skipping over the water surface, a behavior which is apparently related to predator avoidance.

References 

Waccamaw silverside
Natural history of North Carolina
Fish described in 1946
Endemic fauna of North Carolina